The 2001 Special Olympics World Winter Games was the 7th edition of the Winter Special Olympics World Games.It is a multi-sporting event that was held from March 4, 2001, to March 11, 2001. It was hosted by Anchorage, Alaska which is in Alaska, a state of the United States.

Cross Country Skiing, Alpine Skiing, Speed Skating, Floor Hockey, Snowshoeing and Snowboarding were the sporting events that took place at the Winter Special Olympics. More than 2750 athletes and coaches from 80 countries participated at the Games.

The Local Organizing Committee raised about 17 million for the Games while more than 6000 people worked as volunteers for the Games.

This event is set to be the largest sporting event held in the history of Alaska.

References 

Special Olympics
March 2001 sports events in the United States